This is a list of universities in Grenada.

Universities 
 Business Support Centre
 Maurice Bishop English Institute
 St. George's University - 2 campuses
 T.A. Marryshow Community College - 4 campuses
 University of the West Indies - Grenada campus

See also 
 List of universities by country

References

Grenada
Grenada
Universities